The Association of Craftsmen in Copenhagen (Danish: Haandværkerforeningen i Kjøbenhavn) is an interest organisation based in Copenhagen, Denmark. Its 2,200 members are owners of small and medium large companies. It is affiliated with 35 guilds and industry organisations.

History

The association was founded at the initiative of master joiner Lasenius Kramp in 1840 to promote the interest of craftsmen of all trades.

Håndværkerforeningen acquired a former Freemasons' Hall on Kronprinsensgade (No. 7) in 1868. They had a 2000-volume library reading room and billiard room in the building but moved out after taking over Moltke's Mansion on Dronningens Tværgade in 1930.

Headquarters
In 1880, the Craftsmen's Association acquired Moltke's Mansion on the corner of Bredgade and Fronningens Tværgade in Copenhagen. The following year the association expanded the building with a new wing with an assembly hall.

Residential portfolio

Håndværkerforenignen owns a large number of residences in the Greater Copenhagen area. Alderstrøst is the name of two residential complexes built by Håndværkerforeningen to provide affordable housing for elderly, indigent members and their widows in the Nørrebro district of Copenhagen. The oldest is located on Nørrebrogade (Nørrebrogade 17, Baggesensgade 10 and Blågårdsgade 9). The other one is located at the corner of Nørre Allé (No. 15–19) and Møllegade (No. 28–30). The Nørreborgade complex is no longer owned by Håndværkerforeningen.

Håndværkerhaven is a residential complex built by Håndværkerforeningen next to Rmdrup station in 1940. It consists of five buildings with a total of 351 mainly cheap one and two-room apartments.

The Bispebjerg Bakke housing estate was built by Håndværkerforeningen in collaboration with Realdania to design by the artist Bjørn Nørgaard with use of old building practices in 2004–06. It is located in the Bispebjerg district of Copenhagen.

Håndværkerforeningen also owns a number of other properties in the Copenhagen area. These include the historic Møllmanns Landsted on Allégade in Frederiksberg. It consists of a Neoclassical house in the courtyard from 1794 and a building on the street from

Awards

Medal
Copenhagen City Hall plays host to an annual banquet where Håndværkerforeningen's medal in silver or bronze is awarded to the best new craftsmen in Copenhagen. The ceremony has been attended by members of the Danish royal family since 1927.

Honorary Craftsman of the Year
Since 1973, Håndværkerforeningen has awarded the title Honorary Craftsman of the Year (Danish: Årets Æreshåndværker) to an individual for his or her significant contribution to Danish society. Former Honorary Craftsmen of the Year are:
 2015: Bertel Haarder, politician
 2014: Olafur Eliasson, artist
 2013: Susanne Bier, film director
 2012: Asger Aamund, businessman
 2011: Claus Meyer, gastronomic entrepreneur
 2010: Anders Fogh Rasmussen, politician
 2009: Hans Edvard Nørregård-Nielsen, art historian
 2008: Ulrik Wilbek, sport coach
 2007: Michael Pram Rasmussen, businessman
 2006: Michael Kvium, artist
 2005: Kasper Holten, opera director and arts administrator
 2004: Johannes Møllehave, priest and writer
 2003: Ghita Nørby, actress
 2002: Jørgen Mads Clausen, businessman
 2001: Lene Vestergaard Hau, physicist and professor
 2000: Benny Andersen, poet and composer
 1999: Niels-Henning Ørsted Pedersen, jazz musician
 1998: Bjørn Nørgaard, artist
 1997: Hanne Reintoft, social worker and politician
 1996: Michala Petri, musician and professor
 1995: Niels Due Jensen, businessman
 1994: Erik Mortensen, fashion designer
 1993: Bille August, film director
 1992: Poul Schlüter, politician
 1991: Mette Koefoed Bjørnsen, economist and conciliator
 1990: Michael Schønwandt, conductor
 1989: Søren T. Lyngsø, engineer and businessman
 1988: Lise Nørgaard, author
 1987: Frits Helmuth, actor
 1986: Inge Genefke, læge og menneskerettighedsforkæmper
 1985: Erik Werner, bladtegner
 1984: Christian Rovsing, ingeniør og erhvervsleder
 1983: Godtfred Kirk Christiansen, businessman
 1982: Mogens Frohn Nielsen, captain and educator
 1981: Mærsk Mc-Kinney Møller, businessman
 1980: Margrethe II of Denmark
 1979: Lis Møller, journalist and politician
 1978: Per V. Brüel, engineer and businessman
 1977: Victor Borge, pianist and entertainer
 1976: Steen Eiler Rasmussen, architect
 1975: Piet Hein, poet, mathematician
' 1974: Bjørn Wiinblad, ceramist, designer and designer
 1973: Robert Jacobsen, artist

Grants and scholarships
 Tømrermester Th. P. Stillinges Fond
 Kurvemøbelfabrikant G. Frickenmeier og Hustrus Legat
 Haandværkerforeningens Understøttelsesfond
 Haandværkerforeningens Fond (Alderstrøst)
 Haandværkerforeningens Stiftelse Alderstrøsts Legatfond
 H.C. Heegaard og Hustrus Legat
 Det Massmannske Legat
 Drejermester P.A. Parsfelds Mindelegat
 Snedkermester Rasmus Pedersens Fond
 Ester Oline Nielsens Fond
 Begravelseskassen
 Johan Bekker og Hustrus Stiftelse

References

External links
 Official website

Organizations based in Copenhagen
Organizations established in 1840
1840 establishments in Denmark